Campanula erinus is a species of annual herb in the genus Campanula (bellflowers). They have a self-supporting growth form. Individuals can grow to 11 cm tall.

Sources

References 

erinus
Flora of Malta